The 2013 ABL Playoffs is the postseason of the 2013 ABL Regular Season which began on Saturday, 23 May 2013, and concluded on 12 June 2013 when the San Miguel Beermen were crowned the 2013 ABL Finals Champions after sweeping the Indonesia Warriors in the 2013 ABL Finals. The four teams with the best regular season record qualified for the playoffs; the team with the higher seed was awarded the home court advantage.

The semifinals were in a best-of-5 format; the team that first won thrice advanced to the next round. The venues alternated between the opposing teams; the higher seed hosting Game 1, 2 and 5 (if necessary), while the lower seed hosted Game 3 and 4 (if necessary).

Bracket

Semifinals

Beermen vs. Slammers

Warriors vs. Dragons

Finals

Champions

References

External links
 The official website of the Asean Basketball League

Playoffs
ASEAN Basketball League playoffs